The Ethiopian–Eritrean Federation was a coalition between the former Italian colony of Eritrea and the Ethiopian Empire. It was established as a result of the renunciation of Italy’s rights and titles to territorial possessions in Africa, inclusive of all its established territories or colonies made effective by the Treaty of Peace with Italy of 1947. The fate of Eritrea was contingent on numerous political, social, and economic ideals of Eritreans that ranged from leftists favoring independence, conservatives favoring Ethiopian crown rule, and Eritreans who favored a political union of the two sides of the spectrum. In an attempt to provide Eritrea with ultimate autonomy under an Eritrean curated constitution and governmental elections, UN Resolution 390 (A) was devised to implement such welfare to the individuals it was to be imposed upon.

Background

Eritrea was placed under the decree of the British Military Administration (B.M.A.) in April 1941 which was soon to be called the British Administration in 1949 - continuing until the discharge of the federation on 15 September 1952, concurrent with the signing of the Termination of Powers Proclamation. Following the implementation of the Treaty of Peace with Italy which came into effect on 15 September 1947, the Four Power Commission of Investigation were tasked with making internal inquiries in Eritrea to determine the most effective method of governance following the disbandment with its Italian colonizers. The commission was devised of the major powers of the time, namely the United Kingdom, the Soviet Union, the United States, and France, in which if a single conclusion could not be made within the constraints of a year, the matter was to be referred elsewhere. The General Assembly formulated a United Nations Commission for Eritrea for further consideration in November 1949. Using the consultation and advice of international governments regarding the status of Eritrea, the report was presented at the Fifth Session of the United Nations, of which the General Assembly favored the resolution set by the Burma and South African schools of thought in accordance to a federation between Ethiopia and Eritrea. Following this session, a draft of the Eritrean constitution based on democratic pretensions was to be drafted and studied and adopted by the Eritrean Assembly as well as the Federal Act to be included as a sort of federal constitution. The final stage of implementation was to obtain the ratification of the Emperor of Ethiopia of both the constitution and Federal Act. The Commissioner, Mr. Eduardo Anze Matienzo, reported back to the General Assembly in its Seventh Session in December 1952, receiving a unanimous popular vote.

Political Party Uprisings

From 1941 until 1952, the British Administration acted as an intermediate governing appointment as the political interest and socioeconomic well-being of the Eritrean people was being assessed to form a more autonomous predication. The emergence of political parties was initiated with Haile Selassie’s return to the Ethiopian throne in May of 1941, where to immediate effect he set out on the acquisition of Eritrea and Somaliland into the Ethiopian state. This political perspective was synonymous with the organization known as 'Mahbar Feqri Hagar Eretra’ (Society for the Love of the Land of Eritrea) which would then become the Unionist Party in 1944. Most Eritreans during this time did not favor the alignment of the Ethiopian crown and Eritrea. The emanation of the Unionist Party was challenged two years later with the materialization of the Moslem League in 1946 which incurred enormous following from the mostly-Muslim western part of the country, and a small portion from the Christian Highlands. A segmentation from the Moslem League was erected in 1947 and came to be known as the National Moslem Party of Massawa. Following was another predominantly Muslim organization known as the New Eritrean Pro-Italy Party maintaining a large Italian community supporting the ideology that if Rome desired to reacquire Eritrea, Italy would assist in obtaining its independence. A predominantly Christian party was also incurred in February 1948 known as the Eritrean Liberal Progressive Party, opposing any union with Ethiopia. On 25 July 1949, the Independence Bloc was devised and consisted of all major parties except the Unionist. Political parties continued to branch off from their original predecessors to represent more refined interests and many secluded to form singular parties representing the dominate political aspiration. Affiliation with political parties was no more strictly determinate on religious alliance as it was with geographical locale. However, parties often shared common interests, such as regional - highland versus lowland - and faith - Muslim versus Christian. Most of the parties sustained an anti-union sentiment which was met with intimidation and interference by the Ethiopian crown.

Federation

In March 1952, elections were conducted by secret ballot. The right to vote was limited to males over the age of twenty-one, of Eritrean descent, who had maintained residency for at least a year’s time. Conversely, Italo-Eritreans and Eritreans of mixed ethnicity were denied the vote. The Unionist Party won thirty-two out of sixty-eight seats of the constituency. Tedla Bairu of the Unionist Party became the first Chief Executive of Eritrea along with Ali Radai of the Muslim League of the Western Province (MLWP) whom became president of the new Eritrean Assembly. The Eritrean Assembly passed constitutional amendments that instated a unicameral, four-year assembly, the granting of Eritrean citizenship to federal nationals in accordance with Eritrean laws, the denial of the Ethiopian imperial representative’s right to comment on draft legislation, the establishment of Tigrinya and Arabic, along with English, as the official languages- and the creation of an Eritrean flag. These amendments came to be ratified on July 12, 1952. Taxes and custom duties were raised, and Eritreans were to procure identity cards costing an enormous sum. Economic policies established after the construction of the federation immensely disadvantaged ethnic Eritreans by maintaining their economic liberalization. The leadership style of Bairu drew rising opposition from the Eritrean people and opposing political parties which forced his resignation in July 1955. In 1954, Amharanisation of the population ensued. Tigrayan and Amhara governors and other political office holders were appointed to administrative posts. Freedom of the press was diminished, and central administrators sought to hire Tigrinya-speaking Christian Eritreans over Muslims, since the country was majority Christian. Asfaha Woldemicheal, whom obtained pro-unionist sentiment was elected following Bairu’s resignation. Woldemichael proposed the installation of an Eritrean administration, the adoption of the Ethiopian flag and the introduction of Ethiopian administrators and teachers in Eritrea. Educated Eritreans open to mobility were incentivized to mobilize against the Ethiopian state. Eritrean students were disadvantaged by the need to learn Amharic as well as English to achieve secondary-level education, rather than Tigrinya and Arabic. In 1956, Idris Mohammed Adem, a Muslim Eritrean was elected as President of the Assembly generating confrontational Eritrean and Ethiopian relations. The unwillingness of the Unionist Party and the Muslim League to compromise caused Adem to resign in the fall of 1957. As Eritrean mobilization ensued the prevalence of the Eritrean Liberation Movement (ELM) was established gaining support of Christians and Muslims alike, as well as those left behind by Ethiopia’s economic liberalization policies. By May 1960, the Eritrean flag was expelled from the Assembly and the seal and name of the government replaced by, “Eritrean Administration under Haile Selassie, Emperor of Ethiopia. The judicial system formulated under central control and decisive power was granted to Addis Ababa. In the last election held in Eritrea in 1960, the Unionist Party enacted a pro-Ethiopian executive.

Aftermath

On 14 November 1962, the Ethiopian government breached the terms of the UN Resolution 390 (A) and of its own volition annexed Eritrea determining it a province. Protest against the Ethiopian government was imminently provoked and a movement seeking the complete and utter independence of Eritrea ensued. This movement became known as the Eritrean Liberation Front (ELF) founded by the exiled Idris Mohammed Adem.

References

External links 
 390 (V) – Eritrea: Report of the United Nations Commission for Eritrea; Report of the Interim Committee of the General Assembly on the Report of the United Nations Commission for Eritrea

 
States and territories established in 1952
1952 establishments in Africa
1962 disestablishments in Africa

de:Eritrea (Provinz)#Föderation